The Bishop of Ipswich was an episcopal title used by a suffragan bishop of the Church of England Diocese of Norwich, in the Province of Canterbury, England.

The first Bishop of Ipswich was created under the Suffragan Bishops Act 1534, and the title took its name after the county town of Ipswich in Suffolk. After the first suffragan bishop, the position fell into abeyance. It was revived in 1899, with two more suffragan bishops, but eventually, through reorganisation within the Church of England in 1914, Ipswich became part of the Diocese of St Edmundsbury and Ipswich.

List of bishops

References

External links
 Crockford's Clerical Directory - Listings

Bishops of Ipswich
Anglican suffragan bishops in the Diocese of Norwich